The Siemens Modular Metro is a family of electric multiple unit trains for rapid transit systems produced by Siemens Mobility (originally Siemens Transportation Systems) and used by rail operators around the world. The vehicle concept was launched in Vienna in 2000 and is a modular concept allowing many variants of metro vehicles. Previously known as Modular Mobility, Siemens, whose rail equipment division had since been renamed Siemens Mobility, still uses the abbreviation Mo.Mo; however, very little more of these trains are being built, since Siemens had moved to their Inspiro metro platform in 2013.

Technology
The train is designed for use on systems in the 20,000 to 60,000 passengers/hour range. The design of the train bodies is by Porsche Design. Modules in the system include various vehicle ends, doors, gangways, roof-mounted air-conditioning, and interiors. Stainless steel or aluminium construction is available, in three cross sections: straight sidewalls, sidewalls sloping at 3 degrees, and contoured.

Operators
 Guangzhou Metro: 21 six-car modular trains which build with Adtranz for line 1, 120 cars which is based on it for line 3.
 Bangkok Transit System Skytrain: 57 4-car sets (22 of which built by a consortium with Bozankaya)
 Taipei Metro, Taiwan: 36 C321 and 6 C341 six-car sets for the Blue line
 Vienna U-Bahn: designated as Type V, 6-car units.
 Shanghai Metro: 28 six-car modular trains for Line 4, 10 trains for an extension of Line 1. First two trains in Vienna, remainder built in China.
 Metro Trains Melbourne: 72 3-car trains locally designated as Siemens Nexas.
 Bangkok Metropolitan Rapid Transit: 54 3-car sets for the Blue Line
 Oslo Metro: 115 3-car units locally designated as MX3000.
 Nuremberg U-Bahn U2 and U3: 30 two-car driverless trains designated as DT3, 36m long, 2.9m wide with an inter-car gangway. 80 seats and room for 240 standing passengers.
 Kaohsiung Metro: 42 3-car sets, with provision to eventually be expanded to 6-car sets

Design Origins
The bodies of the trains evolved from the 1993 DT2 Series used in the Nuremberg U-Bahn whose design in turn came from production of the A Series built for the nearby Munich U-Bahn.

See also
 Alstom Metropolis and Movia
 Siemens Inspiro, the successor to the Modular Metro

References

External links

 Siemens MoMo flyer - 'The City needs Mobility'
 Porsche Design portfolio

Siemens multiple units
Siemens